The Lady in Me is the third studio album by the American recording artist Meli'sa Morgan, released in 1990 on Capitol Records. The album was a commercial disappointment. The lead single, "Can You Give Me What I Want", became a top 30 hit on Billboards Top R&B Songs chart.

Critical reception
Ebony called the album "a delightful mixture of driving dance grooves and meaningful, romantic ballads."

Track listing

Credits
Credits taken from album liner notes.

Composed By [All Interludes] – Attala Zane Giles, Meli'sa Morgan
Vocals Arranged By – Meli'sa Morgan, Additional Vocals, Arranged By – Attala Zane Giles
Drum Programming – Attala Zane Giles (tracks: 1, 3, 4, 6 to 10), Cornelius Mims (tracks: 2, 5) 
Backing Vocals – Attala Zane Giles (tracks: 1, 10), Kevin Dorsey (tracks: 1, 10), Meli'sa Morgan (tracks: 1 to 3, 5 to 10)
Bass – Cornelius Mims (tracks: 6) 
Guitar – Attala Zane Giles (tracks: 1, 3, 6 to 8)
Horns – Cornelius Mims (tracks: 2, 5)
Keyboards – Attala Zane Giles (tracks: 1, 3, 4, 6 to 10), Cornelius Mims (tracks: 2, 5) 
Saxophone – Gerald Albright (tracks: 6) 
Percussion – Attala Zane Giles (tracks: 1, 3), Paulinho Da Costa (tracks: 5, 6, 8)
Piano – Eddie Fluellen (tracks: 8), Wayne Vaughn (tracks: 7) 
Percussion – Paulinho Da Costa (tracks: 5, 6, 8)
Keyboards [Additional] – Eddie Fluellen (tracks: 6)
Engineer [Mix] – Barney Perkins
Engineer [Recording] – Robert Macias
Co-producer – Meli'sa Morgan 
Executive-Producer – Scott Folks
Producer – Attala Zane Giles

Recorded at: Institute Of Groove Research, Malibu, Ultimo Studios, Westwood, and the Lighthouse, North Hollywood, California

Singles

References

Meli'sa Morgan albums
1990 albums
Capitol Records albums